Prunus conradinae is a species of flowering cherry native to Fujian, Gansu, Guangxi, Guizhou, Henan, Hubei, Hunan, Shaanxi, Sichuan, Yunnan and Zhejiang provinces of China. There it prefers to grow in forested ravines and slopes at 500 to 2100m above sea level.  A small tree growing to at most 10m, it has leaves that are lighter green on their undersides. It has fragrant, white to pale pink flowers with 32 to 54 stamens. It is planted outside its native range as an ornamental due to its habit of flowering in late winter. In warmer conditions it may even flower in early January.

References

conradinae
Cherry blossom
Cherries
Endemic flora of China
Flora of North-Central China
Flora of South-Central China
Flora of Southeast China
Ornamental trees
Plants described in 1912